Dodo Pizza is a worldwide pizza delivery franchise founded in 2011 by Fyodor Ovchinnikov. The corporation was founded in Syktyvkar, Russia. Its headquarters are also in Syktyvkar, as well as in Moscow. 

As of January 2023, the company has 787 pizzerias in Russia and 95 in 15 other countries (Kazakhstan, United States, United Kingdom, Germany, Nigeria, Vietnam, China, Estonia, Lithuania, Romania, Slovenia, Belarus, Uzbekistan, Kyrgyzstan and Poland). It's the largest pizza chain in Russia and Kazakhstan and one of Europe's fastest-growing restaurant chains.

Operations 

Ovchinnikov states that the company views itself as an IT-driven retail company based on the principle of transparency. Dodo Pizza uses a cloud-based system known as Dodo IS that collects and processes operations data, reports real-time business analytics, and helps kitchen and delivery staff to be more efficient by allowing for more informed decision-making.

History 

In 2014, the company ran the largest crowdfunding initiative in Russia to date, raising over $2 million from 180 private investors. Dodo also made headlines from Washington to Tokyo with what it billed as the world's first commercial delivery of pizzas by drone, to customers in the central square in Syktyvkar.

In September 2018, Fyodor Ovchinnikov announced that the chain would grow its IT team from 60 to 250 developers in two years, and by October 2019, Dodo Pizza has doubled it.

According to the chain's public Top Pizza Shop Sales Ranking, the best-performing Dodo Pizza store in Novy Urengoy, Russia netted $166,086 in sales in March 2019.

In 2018, Dodo Pizza sold the franchise rights for Nigeria to Quality Foods Africa, the same group of British investors that brought Krispy Kreme to that continent's most populous country. The first of a planned 20 Dodos will open in October 2019 in Lagos.

In 2019, Dodo Pizza opened a cashless pizza store in China, its “primary market of the future” along with Britain. In November 2019, the company received GRLC Distinction Award for Innovation at Global Restaurant Leadership Conference in Singapore.

In 2019, the company planned to add 1,000 pizza shops in Europe, Asia and Africa over the next five years and to hit $500 million in network revenue by 2021 and $1 billion by 2024.

In 2022, the founder of the network announced that the network would leave Great Britain, which included 5 Dodo Pizza outlets. One of the reasons for the network's problems was the economic sanctions imposed on Russia after its invasion of Ukraine, but British branches had already experienced declines in turnover.

See also 
 List of pizza chains
 List of pizza franchises
 List of pizza varieties by country

References 

Companies based in Syktyvkar
Fast-food chains of the United States
Fast-food franchises
Pizza chains of Russia
Pizza chains of the United Kingdom
Pizza chains of the United States
Pizza franchises
Restaurant chains in the United States
Restaurants established in 2011